The Western Australia PGA Championship, currently known as the CKB WA PGA Championship is a Tier 2 golf tournament on the PGA Tour of Australasia. Since 2012 it has been held at Kalgoorlie Golf Course.

Winners

Notes

References

External links
Coverage on the PGA Tour of Australasia's official site
List of winners

PGA Tour of Australasia events
Golf tournaments in Australia
Golf in Western Australia
Recurring sporting events established in 1933